Ayur Rekha is a 2007 Indian Malayalam film, directed by GM Manu, starring Sreenivasan, Mukesh, Indrajith, Lakshmi Sharma and Saikumar in the lead roles.

Cast
Sreenivasan as S.P.   S.K. Jecob George/Chakkochen
Mukesh as Thriprayar Madhavan
Indrajith Sukumaran as Adv. Anand
Lakshmi Sharma as Dr. Aparna Menon
Jyothirmayi as Dr. Mallika Anand
Master Mithun as Arun Menon
Jagathy Sreekumar as Thankappan Pillai
Saikumar as Dr. Venugopal
Niyaz Musaliyar as S.I. Balachadran
TP Madhavan as Dr. Thomas George
Salim Kumar as P.C. Ismail
Urvasi as Alice Jacob 
Devi Chandana as Girija
Jagannadha Varma as Adv. G.K. Nambiyar
Nedumudi Venu as Captain Nair
Pradeep
Kochu Preman
Master Ganapathi
Master Vaisakh
Dr Vivin Mathew

Soundtrack
Music: Sabish George, Lyrics: O. N. V. Kurup
 "Indumukhi" - Vineeth Sreenivasan
 "Neelmizhikalo" (D) - M. G. Sreekumar, Ranjini Jose
 "Neelmizhikalo" (F) - Ranjini Jose
 "Sree Ranjini" - M. G. Sreekumar

References

External links

2007 films
2000s Malayalam-language films